Andheri Raat Mein Diya Tere Haath Mein (Hindi translation: In darkness of night, lamp in your hand, another meaning: In darkness of night, given in your hand) is a Hindi film made in 1986. The film is well known for its dual meaning dialogues like in all Dada Kondke films.

Cast
Akshay Vats

Soundtrack
The film contains 6 songs. Among them 5 are duets of Mahendra Kapoor and Shaila Chikhale and one solo is sung by Shaila alone.
"Meri Choli Sila De O"
"Kas Ke Na Dalo"
"Petrol Dalun Ya"
"Andheri Raat Me"
"Teri Chun Chun"
"Aa Pahucha Teri Gali"

External links 
 

1980s Hindi-language films
Films scored by Raamlaxman